Neuroblastoma breakpoint family member 10 is a protein that in Homo sapiens is encoded by the NBPF10 gene.

The full gene is 75,313 bp, with the major isoform of mRNA being 10,697 bp long. The gene is located at 1q21.1. NBPF contains what is known as the DUF1220 repeats. The  highly conserved, repeated region is believed to be originated from MGC8902. The NBPF family has been linked to primate evolution. It is assumed to be related to the 1q21.1 deletion syndrome and 1q21.1 duplication syndrome.

Homology 

Paralogs of NBPF10 includes other NBPF family members.
Orthologs of NBPF10 are found in other primates; distant orthologs are found in bovine, equine, and canine

Functional role 

Although NBPF10's function is unknown, there is reason to believe that NBPF10 is an important biomarker for the Odontoblast Phenotype

Gene Neighborhood 
NOTCH2NL, SEC22B, HFE2, TXNIP are close neighbors of NBPF10.  All of these neighboring genes are well studied in their own right.

Post-translational modification 
NBPF10 has extremely low threonine content which may make the protein less susceptible to post-translational modification.

References 

Human proteins